Grayson Hoffman (born February 23, 1984) is an American fashion photographer. His work has been featured in S Magazine, Vogue, Noelle Flyod Magazine, Zele Magazine, Jute Magazine, Estella Magazine, Kiteboarding Magazine, Hot Bikes Magazine, Street Choppers Magazine and Fashion TV.
Assisted with MTV music video "Need It So Badly" by recording artist Bigg Persona.

Worked as a freelance photojournalist for the Savannah Morning News and for Scripps Treasure Coast Newspapers in South Florida. Also, has been published in Atlanta Journal-Constitution, Palm Beach Post, Miami Herald and Orlando Sentinel. Now, works in commercial and fashion photography, primarily in Miami and New York City.

Early life
Grayson grew up in Miami as a young child and then moved to St.Simons, Georgia with his family.
While in college, worked as the Chief Photo Editor for the George-Anne Daily and completed an internship with the Savannah Morning News Photography Department in Savannah, GA. Summer 2005: Participated in Art History Study Abroad Program at University of Westminster in London. 
After graduating he permanently moved to South Florida. He then played professional golf for a few years and worked as a photo-journalist. Then Grayson turned his attention to commercial, fashion and editorial photography. Grayson currently lives in New York and works with his wife Jamie in Studio LIC

Clients
Clients include Barbara Gerwit, MTV2, syndication with Gallery Stock etc.,4Beauty International, March of Dimes, E! Entertainment, Gantner Electronic, Norton Museum of Art, Florida Center for Investigative Reporting, TCPalm & Independence Day Publishing, MAAC London, Arrow & Sol, MiMo Market Wynwood, Barbara Gerwit® Apparel & Fashion, Shawk!, Celebrity Pink, Lagaci, Blinc Cosmetics, Aloha Paris, Floyd Consultants, Dao Fournier Jewelry, Gia Penta Lingerie, Benchmark Design Group, Agent Publishing, Home Shopping Network, Icikülls Athletic Apparel, March of Dimes, Gantner Electronic, Swimsuit Direct, 4 Beauty International, Delancy Lounge, Digital Media Solutions, Eden Rooftop, Norton Museum of Art, Townhouse Hotel, Inka Fashion, Olez Advanced®, Florida Education Institute, Jeans 2 Love, MetamorphDK, GSaints Swimwear, Signature Flight Support, Palm Beach International Raceway, Real Deal Bikes, Coastal Performance, The Averitt Center for the Arts, 11th Hour Magazine, Independence Day Publishing and Boca Cosmetics Group

Worked with modeling agencies including: MC2, Boca Talent, Michele Pommier, Evolution Model Management and Elite Model Management, Women Management, Ford Models, Next Model Management, Wilhelmina, Fenton New York.

Exhibitions
The Averitt Art Center, The Art Place Museum, Creative Unseen Digital Photography, Art Fusion at GSU, Wynwood Warehouse Project, Chocolate and Art Show March 2016, Espitia Gallery Miami, Group Exhibition January–March 2016, Espitia Gallery Miami, Art Basel Week 2015

Awards
 Best Editorial Photograph, Georgia College Press Association
 Best Feature Photograph, Georgia College Press Association
 Best News Photograph, Georgia College Press Association
 2nd Place Best Sports Photograph, Georgia College Press Association
 2nd Place Sports- National Press Photographers Association
 2nd Place General- National Press Photographers Association
 Honorable Mention - CPID Creative Individual Competition
 KelbyOne Fashion Photo Contest, February 2015

References

External links
 American Society of Media Photographers 
  from FashionTV Grayson Hoffman Selected Works
  from FashionTV Top Photographer Grayson Hoffman On Set in Miami Studio

1984 births
Living people
Fashion photographers
Artists from Miami
Photographers from Florida